Tempera (March 12, 1999 – April 28, 2002) was an American Thoroughbred racehorse.

Background
She was sired by U.S. Racing Hall of Fame inductee and two-time leading sire in North America A.P. Indy who was a son of the 1977 United States Triple Crown of Thoroughbred Racing champion, Seattle Slew. Tempera's American-bred dam, Colour Chart, a daughter of the outstanding sire Mr. Prospector, was raced in France by Sheikh Mohammed where she won the 1990 Prix de l'Opéra and Prix de la Nonette.

Racing career

2001: two-year-old season
In 2001 Tempera Breeders' Cup Juvenile Fillies and was voted American Champion Two-Year-Old Filly.

2002: three-year-old season
At age three, Tempera made two starts at Nad Al Sheba Racecourse in Dubai. She ran second in the March 14, 2002 UAE 1000 Guineas then finished second again in the April 13 UAE Oaks.

Sent to Churchill Downs in Louisville, Kentucky, on April 26 Tempera developed a fever and was sent to Hagyard-Davidson-McGee veterinary clinic near Lexington, Kentucky where her condition deteriorated as she developed colitis and laminitis. She was humanely euthanized during the evening of April 28, 2002.

*race in meters, approx in furlongs

References

1999 racehorse births
2002 racehorse deaths
Thoroughbred family 14-b
Racehorses bred in Kentucky
Racehorses trained in the United States
Eclipse Award winners
Breeders' Cup Juvenile Fillies winners